Alexander Michael Freeman (born August 9, 2004) is an American professional soccer player who plays as a defender for Orlando City in Major League Soccer.

Club career

Orlando City 
Born in Fort Lauderdale, Florida, Freeman attended American Heritage School in Plantation and played three seasons for Weston FC Academy before joining the Orlando City Academy in 2020. In 2021, he made 30 appearances for the under-17 team, scoring eight goals and providing 15 assists as Orlando City were crowned the inaugural MLS Next Cup U17 champions. In December 2021, Freeman committed to NCAA Division I program Louisville Cardinals.

On February 15, 2022, Orlando City signed Freeman to a four-year homegrown contract with an additional option year having spent preseason with the first-team. He made his professional debut with the team's reserve affiliate, Orlando City B, in MLS Next Pro on March 26, 2022.

International career 
In March 2021, Freeman was called up to a 28-player United States youth regional identification camp.

Personal life 
Freeman is the son of former American football wide receiver Antonio Freeman who won Super Bowl XXXI with the Green Bay Packers in 1997.

Career statistics

Club

References

External links 
 Alex Freeman at Orlando City SC
 

2004 births
Living people
People from Fort Lauderdale, Florida
Soccer players from Florida
American soccer players
Association football defenders
Orlando City SC players
Orlando City B players
Homegrown Players (MLS)
MLS Next Pro players
United States men's youth international soccer players